Presidential elections were held in Mali on 28 July 2013, with a second round run-off held on 11 August. Ibrahim Boubacar Keïta defeated Soumaïla Cissé in the run-off to become the new President of Mali.

Background
According to the 1992 constitution, elections should have taken place in 2012. The first round was originally scheduled for 29 April, and the second round scheduled for 13 May. The first round was also planned to include a referendum on revising the constitution.

The elections would have marked the end of the second term of office of President Amadou Toumani Touré, conforming to the Malian constitution which limits individuals to two presidential terms. Touré confirmed, at a press conference on 12 June 2011, that he would not stand for election again.

Insurgency and coup d'etat

In 2012, Tuareg and other peoples in northern Mali's Azawad region started an insurgency in the north under the banner of the National Movement for the Liberation of Azawad.  The Malian Army complained that it was ill-equipped to fight the insurgents, who had benefited from an influx of heavy weaponry from the 2011 Libyan civil war as well as other sources. On 21 March 2012 elements of the army staged a military coup d'état and formed the National Committee for the Restoration of Democracy and State. The scheduled elections were then called into question after coup leaders suspended the constitution and arrested government ministers, while promising that, at some time in the future, elections would be held to return governance to civilian control. Following the coup, the rebels made further advances to capture the three biggest cities in the north. On 1 April 2012, under pressure from the Economic Community of West African States (ECOWAS), the leader of the junta Captain Amadou Sanogo announced that the constitution would be restored.

Following economic sanctions and a blockade by ECOWAS on the country, a deal brokered in Burkina Faso by President Blaise Compaoré under the auspices of ECOWAS, was signed that saw Sanogo cede power to Dioncounda Traoré to assume the presidency in an interim capacity until the election was held.

On 1 July 2013, 6,000 of a future total of 12,600 UN peacekeeping troops officially took over responsibility for patrolling the country's north from France and the ECOWAS' International Support Mission to Mali (AFISMA). The force would be led by former second-in-command in Darfur, Rwandan General Jean Bosco Kazura, and will be known as the MINUSMA. Though the group was expected to play a role in the election, the electoral commission's president, Mamadou Diamountani, said it would be "extremely difficult" to arrange for up to eight million voting identification cards when there were 500,000 displaced people as a result of the conflict.

Electoral organisation controversies
To improve the electoral process, the government decided to use the election process of the Administrative Census to Elections (RACE) to further direct the Minister of Territorial Administration and Local Government and the General Administrator of Elections, General Kafougona Kone. The majority of political parties would prefer the use of another electoral system under the Administrative Census Vocation of Civil Status (RAVEC), an electoral process considered more reliable. However, the government considers that this second process with RAVEC presents a number of difficulties with identification of non-Malians living in the Côte d'Ivoire and there are a large number of corrections to be made in a very short time.

The cost of using this other process is estimated at 41 billion West African CFA francs (nearly $83 million US dollars). At a meeting between the government and political parties on 3 January 2012, the National Director of the Interior, to the Ministry of Territorial Administration and Local Government, Bassidi Coulibaly, acknowledged the weak influence of citizens for revision of the electoral lists.

Just as campaigning was about to get under way, the Malian government lifted the state of emergency in place in the country since the northern battles.

Although the jihadist group MUJAO warned people not to vote and threatened to attack polling stations, no violence occurred during the elections.

Candidates
Several candidates declared their intention to run for the original elections or were invested by their party.

Jamille Bittar, senior vice president of the Party for Economic and Social Development of Mali (PDES), announced his presidential candidacy on 30 January 2012. He is the President of the Chamber of Commerce and Industry and he is on the Economic and Social Council and he is supported by the Union of movements and associations in Mali, created two months ago.
Sidibé Aminata Diallo, former Minister of Education, she was previously a candidate in the presidential election of 2007, and was supported for her candidacy on 24 December 2011 by the Rally for Environmental Education and Sustainable Development (REDD).
Cheick Modibo Diarra, Malian astrophysicist who worked at NASA and president of Microsoft Africa. On 6 March 2011, in Bamako, he presented a training policy, the Rally for Mali's development (RPDM), created for the 2012 presidential election.
Housseini Amion Guindo, President of Convergence for the development of Mali, was appointed on 14 September 2011 as presidential election candidate by the political group PUR (parties united for the Republic).
 Mamadou Djigué, announced his candidacy on 22 September 2011 under the banner of the Youth Movement for Change and Development (MJCD). This announcement was made at a meeting held at the International Conference Centre of Bamako, in the presence of his father Ibrahima N'Diaye, Senior Vice President of the Alliance for Democracy in Mali-African Party for Solidarity and Justice.
 Aïchata Cissé Haïdara, nicknamed Chato, is the presidential candidate from the Alliance Chato 2013 for the Malian election on July 28. The party's social and economic program,"For a Strong Mali," focuses on youth, women and the rural world. Currently the MP from Bourem in northern Mali, during the recent Malian crisis Chato distinguished herself in a fight against misinformation from the MNLA (National Movement for the Liberation of Azawad, initially a Tuareg secessionist movement). Chato also worked for more than 20 years in the development of Mali in particular and of Africa in general. A union activist, she led a massive battle for Malian workers in Air Afrique; they were the only Africans to have been compensated after the firm was liquidated.   Mme Haidara is a founder and managing director of a travel and tourism company, Wani Tour. 
Ibrahim Boubacar Keïta, former Prime Minister of Mali, former speaker of the National Assembly, and president of the Rally for Mali (RPM), announced his candidacy on January 14, 2012. He was a presidential candidate in the previous presidential elections of 2002 and 2007. He has the support of fifteen political parties that signed a memorandum of agreement on 12 January 2012 to "create a Republican and Democratic center that is strong and stable". The political parties are: Movement for the Independence, Renaissance and African Integration (Miria), the Union of Mali for Progress (UMP), the Malian Union-African Democratic Rally, the African Front for the mobilization and alternation (Fama), the Rally of Democratic Republicans (RDR), the Rally for Justice in Mali (RJD), Sigikafo Oyédamouyé Party (PSO), the Democratic Consultation, the Party of the difference in Mali (PDM), the Socialist and Democratic Party of Mali (PSDM), the People's Progress Party (PPP), the PPM, the MPLO, the RUP, the Democratic Action for Change and Alternative in Mali (ADCAM) and the Rally for Mali (RPM).
 Aguibou Koné, former student leader, announced on 25 January 2012 that he would run for president in 2012 to defend the colours of a political organisation called "to Yèlè" (this means "to open" in the national language Bambara).
Oumar Mariko, Member of Parliament, was supported by the Party African Solidarity for Democracy and Independence on 26 June 2011. He has already been a candidate in the two previous presidential elections in 2002 and 2007. In his program, he wants to "build a strong democratic state, respectful of republican values, and equitable distribution of national resources".
 Achérif Ag Mohamed was nominated on 12 November 2011 by the National Union for Labor and Development.
Soumana Sacko, former Prime Minister and President of the National Convention for Africa Solidarity (CNAS) declared his candidacy on 18 December 2011.
 Yeah Samake, mayor of the rural town of Ouélessébougou, announced his candidacy for presidency on 12 November 2011 on behalf of the Party for the civic and patriotic (PACP), a new political party. In reaction against alleged corruption of the other candidates, Samake is doing most of his fundraising online and in the United States.
Modibo Sidibé, former Prime Minister, announced his candidacy on 17 January 2012.
Mountaga Tall was selected as a presidential candidate by the National Congress of Democratic Initiative (CNID) on 15 January 2012 in Bamako. The lawyer was a presidential candidate in 1992, 2002, and 2007.
 Cheick Bougadary Traoré, president of the African Convergence for Renewal (CARE), was selected as a candidate of his party on 28 January 2012. Traore is the son of President Moussa Traoré.
Dramane Dembélé was designated as Adéma-PASJ's candidate on 10 April 2013.

Results

On 3 August 2013, ADEMA candidate Dramane Dembélé, who placed third in the election, announced his support for Ibrahim Boubacar Keita in the second round, saying that "we are in the Socialist International, we share the same values". However, in endorsing Keita he contradicted the official stance of ADEMA, which had backed Keita's rival, Soumaïla Cissé, on the previous day. The party stressed that Dembélé was speaking only for himself and that the party still supported Cissé.

References

Presidential elections in Mali
Mali
Presidential election